The 9th season of the FA Women's Premier League. Croydon F.C.'s women's team, champions in the previous season, was bought by Charlton Athletic F.C. and allowed to bear its name. Liverpool, founder members of the Women's Premier League, were relegated. For the first time the champions, Arsenal, qualified for the inaugural UEFA Women's Cup, the women's European club championship.

National Division

Northern Division

 Promoted: Manchester City W.F.C. - winners Northern Combination Women's Football League 2000–01
 Promoted: Mansfield Town L.F.C. - winners Midland Combination Women's Football League 2000–01 and replaced North Notts

Southern Division

 Promoted: Bristol Rovers W.F.C. - winners South West Combination Women's Football League 2000–01
 Promoted: Fulham L.F.C. - winners South East Combination Women's Football League 2000–01

References
RSSSF

Eng
FA Women's National League seasons
Wom
1